The 20 gauge shotgun, also known as "20 bore", is a type of smooth-bore shotgun that fires a shell that is smaller in caliber than a 12 gauge shotgun. It is often used by beginning shooters for target practice and for hunting small game.

Description
It takes 20 lead balls of the diameter of a 20 gauge shotgun bore to equal one pound, while it only takes 12 lead balls of the diameter of a 12 gauge shotgun bore to equal the same weight. A 20 gauge shotgun is more suitable for hunting certain types of game or for some hunters because it recoils less, and the guns weigh less and may be smaller.

Regarding the yellow body tube color 20gauge ammunition usually has, it has been reserved in SAAMI documentation saying "SAAMI has reserved yellow for 20 gauge ammunition" "This ammunition shall have a body tube that is primarily yellow" "Yellow shall not be used for any other gauge/bore shotshell body" "No other recommendations are made as to the color of service body tubes for other gauges/bores"

Specifications
20 gauge shotguns are especially suitable for hunting game birds such as quail, grouse and Mallards when using lead free, birdshot game loads. A 20 gauge buckshot load would most commonly be utilized in close-to-mid range, self defense scenarios. While slug loads are generally less accurate than rounds used in Rifles, powerful, high grain, slug loads can provide superior ballistics for hunting deer, when paired with a rifled barrel.

Performance
A usually lower gun weight makes a 20 gauge appropriate for young, elderly, or less muscular shooters who may have a difficult time carrying, aiming, and firing a larger shotgun, or just don't need a larger gun to hunt their target game. In addition, 20 gauge shotguns generally have less recoil than 10, 12, or 16 gauge versions on average, when comparing standard hunting shells, due to the lower projectile payload. These parameters make the 20-gauge more pleasant to use on extended hunting trips for small game or upland birds, even for people capable of firing magnum-power 12-gauge hunting rounds.

Full-power 20 gauge shells fired from a light  gun will have more felt recoil than reduced-recoil 12 gauge shells fired from a heavy  gun.

See also
 Shotgun shell
 Cartridge (firearms)

References

External links
  ANSI/SAAMI Cartridge & Chamber Drawings PDF links page
  ANSI/SAAMI Cartridge & Chamber Drawings, 2019-04-23 PDF for Shotshells

Shotguns
Shotgun shells